Fernando José Alves Brassard (born 11 April 1972) is a Portuguese retired footballer who played as a goalkeeper.

Playing career
Born in Lourenço Marques, Portuguese Mozambique, Brassard emerged through S.L. Benfica's youth ranks, but was soon deemed surplus to requirements, making his professional debut with lowly Louletano DC. In the following years he represented C.S. Marítimo, Gil Vicente FC (two spells) and Vitória de Guimarães.

In the summer of 1995, Brassard returned to Benfica for two unassuming seasons, as he had to settle with battling for backup status behind Belgian Michel Preud'homme. He then played one year with Varzim SC – starting but seeing his club be relegated from the Primeira Liga – closing out his Vitória de Setúbal at only 29, being again second-choice during three years.

Brassard was in the squad for both of Portugal winning teams in the FIFA U-20 World Cup, in 1989 and 1991, being part of the dubbed Golden Generation. Alongside teammate João Vieira Pinto and Argentinian Sergio Agüero, he was the only player in the world to win the tournament twice, although he did not play one second in the first edition.

Coaching career
In 2003, shortly after his professional retirement, Brassard joined the senior national team's coaching staff, working with the goalkeepers for several years. In 2010, in the same capacity, he switched to the under-21 side.

Honours

Club
Benfica
Taça de Portugal: 1995–96

International
Portugal
FIFA U-20 World Cup: 1989, 1991
UEFA European Under-21 Championship runner-up: 1994

References

External links

1972 births
Living people
Sportspeople from Maputo
Portuguese footballers
Association football goalkeepers
Primeira Liga players
Liga Portugal 2 players
S.L. Benfica footballers
Louletano D.C. players
C.S. Marítimo players
Gil Vicente F.C. players
Vitória S.C. players
Varzim S.C. players
Vitória F.C. players
Portugal youth international footballers
Portugal under-21 international footballers